West Lavington may refer to:

West Lavington, West Sussex
West Lavington, Wiltshire